Death Is Called Engelchen is a 1963 Czechoslovak war film directed by Ján Kadár and Elmar Klos. It was entered into the 3rd Moscow International Film Festival where it won a Golden Prize.

Plot
At the end of the Second World War Zlín is liberated by advancing Soviet army. Young Czechoslovak partisan named Pavel was injured in a gunfight with Germans and lies in hospital. He is paralyzed and while recovering, he spends his days by lying on his back. He recalls memories from his life during the war - his experience as a resistance fighter, his comrades, his fights with Germans in Slovak mountains and his love, Marta, who acted as a spy for the resistance. He also remembers Engelchen, who is responsible for death of many Pavel's friends and for a massacre of 2 mountain villages. Marta comes to visit Pavel in the hospital to say goodbye. Her work as a spy made her look like a German collaborator to some and it earned her hate. After some time, Pavel recovers and leaves hospital to find Engelchen.

Cast
 Jan Kačer as Pavel
 Eva Poláková as Marta
 Martin Růžek as Doktor
 Blažena Holišová as Schwester Alžběta
 Otto Lackovič as Ondra

References

External links
 

1963 films
1963 war films
1960s Czech-language films
Czechoslovak black-and-white films
Films directed by Ján Kadár
Czech war films
Czech resistance to Nazi occupation in film
Czech World War II films
Czechoslovak World War II films
1960s Czech films
Partisan films